Eko-Ende (or Eko Ende, Eko-Ende) is a community in the Ifelodun Local Government Area of Ọṣun State, Nigeria.

Location

Eko-Ende lies just west of the town of Ikirun.
The farming community lies on the Ikirun-Ogbomoso road, in-between Eko-Ajala and Ore communities.

Dam
The Eko-Ende Dam on the Otin River was impounded in 1973 to form a reservoir with a capacity of 5.5 MCM.
The headworks were designed to supply potable water to the communities of Oba, Eko-Ende, Eko-Ajala, Ikirun, Iragbiji and Okuku.

History
The Jalumi War of 1 November 1878 took place in the hilly country of the northeast of Osun State in the area that includes Ikirun, Iba, Inisa, Okuku and Eko-Ende. It was one of the series of civil wars in Yorubaland between 1793 and 1893.
The traditional ruler is the Elende of Eko-Ende. As of 2013 Oba Abdul-Rauf Adebayo  Ajiboye held this title.

References
Citations

Sources

Populated places in Osun State